Kasina Wielka  is a village in the administrative district of Gmina Mszana Dolna, within Limanowa County, Lesser Poland Voivodeship, in southern Poland.It lies approximately  north-east of Mszana Dolna,  west of Limanowa, and  south of the regional capital Kraków.

Church from 1624

The village has a population of 2,800.

References

Villages in Limanowa County